Jay-Ronne Steven Grootfaam (27 October 2000 – 3 September 2019), better known under his pseudonym RS, was a Dutch drill rapper and the former frontman of the drill rap group FOG. He has been described as "the most well-known member" of one of the most significant drill rap groups of the Netherlands.

Life 
Grootfaam was born in Amsterdam on 27 October 2000. He was raised by parents with a Surinamese background. As a teenager, he followed a vmbo education at Bindelmeer College in Amsterdam. Around this time, he started to create hip hop. A few years later, Grootfaam founded the drill rap group FOG.

Music 
Grootfaam's music was characterized by a demonic and dark aesthetic. He rapped about violence, criminality and his life in the neighbourhood Venserpolder.

Death 
On September 3rd 2019, Grootfaam was stabbed to death by a member of a rival drill rap group. It was the first time in Dutch history that someone died as a result of a drill feud.

Grootfaam's death formed an important moment for the Dutch societal discussion about what role drill rap had played in the at the time increasing cases of knife violence among the youth.

References 

2000 births
2019 deaths
Dutch rappers
Dutch people of Surinamese descent
Musicians from Amsterdam
Deaths by stabbing in the Netherlands
21st-century Dutch musicians
Drill musicians
Male murder victims
People murdered in the Netherlands
Dutch murder victims